Mark Wooldridge (born July 7, 1962) is a former professional tennis player from the United States.

Biography
Wooldridge, the son of a physicist, comes from Santa Barbara in California.

He went to the University of California at Berkeley and played No. 2 singles, before joining the tour full-time in 1983 and playing professionally for four years. He won the men's singles in the Ojai Tennis Tournament in 1984.

At the 1985 US Open he competed in the main draw of the men's doubles with Egan Adams, who he also partnered with to win a Challenger tournament that year in Lagos. He made his only Grand Slam singles appearance at the 1985 Australian Open and was beaten in the first round by local player Brad Drewett. In the men's doubles he and partner Menno Oosting were defeated in the opening round.

Now living in Manhattan Beach, Wooldridge still plays competitive tennis, in over 50s events.

Challenger titles

Doubles: (1)

References

External links
 
 

1962 births
Living people
American male tennis players
Sportspeople from Santa Barbara County, California
Tennis people from California
California Golden Bears men's tennis players